Cochylis similana is a species of moth of the family Tortricidae. It is found in Iran (Yazd Province), eastern Afghanistan, northern Lebanon and the Caucasus.

References

Moths described in 1963
Cochylis